Oncopeltus sanguinolentus, the blood-colored milkweed bug, is a species of seed bug in the family Lygaeidae. It is found in Central America and North America. The species name is sometimes misspelled with an extra "e", as sanguineolentus.

References

Further reading

 

Lygaeidae
Articles created by Qbugbot
Insects described in 1914